This is a list of Michigan Wolverines football players who have attained notability through their performance in the sport of American football and other endeavors.  The list includes over 750 players, including more than 50 All-Americans, three Heisman Trophy winners (Tom Harmon, Desmond Howard and Charles Woodson), six U.S. Congressmen, and a President of the United States (Gerald Ford).  The list is presented in alphabetical order but is sortable by the years and positions at which they played.

Sortable list

See also
 Michigan Wolverines football statistical leaders
 Michigan Wolverines Football All-Americans
 University of Michigan Athletic Hall of Honor

References

External links
 Bentley Historical Library University of Michigan Football Rosters

Michigan sports-related lists